The Martinez Formation is an Eocene Epoch geologic formation in California.

Geology
The formation regionally overlies the Chico Formation and regionally underlies the Tejon Formation or the Ione Formation.

It is exposed in the Clevelin Hills in Riverside County, Santa Ana Mountains in Orange County, northwestern Santa Monica Mountains near Calabasas (California) in Los Angeles County, and north of Mount Diablo/south of the Sacramento Delta in Contra Costa County.

Fossils
The formation preserves fossils dating back to the Paleogene period.

See also

 List of fossiliferous stratigraphic units in California
 
 Paleontology in California

References 

Geologic formations of California
Paleogene California
Eocene Series of North America
Geology of Contra Costa County, California
Geology of Los Angeles County, California
Geology of Orange County, California
Geology of Riverside County, California
Natural history of the Santa Monica Mountains
Santa Ana Mountains